Pedro Beltrán may refer to:
 Pedro Beltrán Espantoso (1897–1979), Peruvian journalist, economist and politician
 Pedro Beltrán (footballer) (born 1988), professional Mexican footballer
 Pedro Beltrán (bishop) (died 1505), Roman Catholic prelate